Mammilla may refer to :

 Mammilla (Africa), an ancient city and bishopric in Mauretania Caesariensis, now a Latin Catholic titular see
 , anatomical Latin for a nipple
 Mammilla (gastropod), a genus of sea snails

See also 
 Mamilla, an old neighborhood in Jerusalem
 Mammillary body, a part of the brain
 Mammillary process, a tubercle on the lumbar vertebrae
 Mammillaria (disambiguation)
 Mammilloydia, a monotypic genus of Cacti